Reanalysis is a new analysis of something. It may refer to:

 Reanalysis (linguistics) or folk etymology, change in a word or phrase resulting from the replacement of an unfamiliar form by a more familiar one
Rebracketing, a process where a word originally derived from one source is broken down into a different set of factors
Back-formation, a process of creating a new word by removing actual or supposed affixes
 New statistical analysis of a data set that has already been analyzed
 A repeat analysis, for example in chemistry

See also
 
 
 Meteorological reanalysis, a project to analyze historical meteorological data
 Ocean reanalysis, a method of combining historical ocean observations with a general ocean model

Analysis